Black Like Sunday is the tenth studio album by American rock band King's X. The songs on this album are rare and originally unreleased recordings that were re-recorded by fan demand. The cover was painted by a fan that won a contest.

Track listing

Personnel
Doug Pinnick – bass, vocals
Ty Tabor – guitar, vocals
Jerry Gaskill – drums, vocals

Liner notes
 Produced by Ty Tabor and King's X
 Mixed and Mastered at Alien Beans Studios by Ty
 All songs by King's X except "Working Man" by Dan McCollam and Doug Pinnick
 Recorded between November 2002 and March 2003 at Alien Beans Studios, Katy, Texas
 Cover painting by Danny Wilson - Satellite Studio

Charts

References

External links
Official website

2003 albums
King's X albums
Metal Blade Records albums